Michel Garbini Pereira (born 9 June 1981), commonly known as Michel, is a Brazilian footballer.

Career

Club
Michel began his career at Atlético Mineiro, before moving to Belgian Pro League side Standard Liège in 2004. After two seasons, Michel returned to Brazil and signed with Campeonato Brasileiro Série A outfit Atlético Paranaense. Subsequently, he played for Náutico and Vila Nova.

In 2010, Michel moved to Superleague Greece club Aris, where he immediately established himself as a regular in the team. In the 2010–11 season, he played in almost all of the matches for Aris, including all twelve Europa League games.

After impressing as a trialist during preseason training camp, Michel signed for Major League Soccer club FC Dallas on 19 February 2013. During his time with the club, he became known as a threat on set pieces with his left foot. He scored his first MLS goal directly from a corner kick during a 4–2 loss at Seattle Sounders FC on 18 May 2013. Although he originally came to the club as a left back, he eventually earned most of his playing time at defensive midfielder. Due to the emergence of Victor Ulloa and Kellyn Acosta, Michel's playing time was limited in 2015. After the season, his contract option was declined by the club.

Michel joined expansion club Rayo OKC of the North American Soccer League in January 2016. He was later named team captain.

International
Michel played for Brazil's Under-23 squad in 2003 making four appearances for the squad.

References

External links

furacao.com 
 

1981 births
Living people
Brazilian footballers
Brazilian expatriate footballers
Clube Atlético Mineiro players
Clube Náutico Capibaribe players
Standard Liège players
Club Athletico Paranaense players
Aris Thessaloniki F.C. players
FC Dallas players
Rayo OKC players
Miami FC players
Belgian Pro League players
Super League Greece players
Major League Soccer players
North American Soccer League players
Expatriate footballers in Belgium
Expatriate footballers in Greece
Expatriate soccer players in the United States
Brazilian expatriate sportspeople in Belgium
Brazilian expatriate sportspeople in Greece
Brazilian expatriate sportspeople in the United States
Association football fullbacks
Association football midfielders
North Texas SC players
USL League One players
Major Arena Soccer League players
Dallas Sidekicks (PASL/MASL) players
FC Dallas non-playing staff